Victor Mayson was a Canadian football player who played for the Edmonton Eskimos. He previously played for the Edmonton Maple Leafs.

References

Year of birth missing (living people)
Canadian football running backs
Edmonton Elks players
Living people